Testosterone furoate (brand name Furotest), also referred to as testosterone furanate in some publications, is an androgen and anabolic steroid and a testosterone ester which is no longer marketed.

See also
 List of androgen esters § Testosterone esters

References

Abandoned drugs
Androgens and anabolic steroids
Androstanes
Furoate esters
Testosterone esters
2-Furyl compounds